The BRM Land Africa is a Portuguese ultralight aircraft, designed and produced by BRM Costruções Aeronáuticas. The aircraft is supplied as a kit for amateur construction or as a complete ready-to-fly-aircraft.

Chris Heintz, the designer of the Zenith STOL CH 701 considers the Land Africa an unauthorized copy of the CH 701. The Land Africa varies from CH 701 in having a wider and longer cockpit.

Design and development
The aircraft was designed to comply with the Fédération Aéronautique Internationale microlight rules. It features a strut-braced high-wing, a two-seats-in-side-by-side configuration enclosed cockpit, fixed tricycle landing gear and a single engine in tractor configuration.

The aircraft is made from aluminum sheet. Standard engines available are the  Rotax 912UL and the  Rotax 912ULS four-stroke powerplants.

The Land Africa replaced the earlier BRM Okavango in production.

Specifications (Land Africa)

References

External links

2000s Portuguese ultralight aircraft
Homebuilt aircraft
Single-engined tractor aircraft
BRM Costruções Aeronáuticas aircraft